Eldar Kamilyevich Mamayev (born 14 June 1985) is a former Russian professional footballer.

Club career
He made his professional debut in the Russian First Division in 2003 for FC Anzhi Makhachkala.

References

1985 births
Living people
Russian footballers
Association football midfielders
FC Anzhi Makhachkala players
FC Ural Yekaterinburg players
FC Nizhny Novgorod (2007) players
FC Khimki players
FC Sakhalin Yuzhno-Sakhalinsk players
Russian Premier League players
FC Sever Murmansk players